The 1925 Cornell Big Red football team was an American football team that represented Cornell University during the 1925 college football season.  In its sixth season under head coach Gil Dobie, the team compiled a 6–2 record and outscored all opponents by a combined total of 258 to 83. The team played its home games at Schoellkopf Field in Ithaca, New York.

Schedule

References

Cornell
Cornell Big Red football seasons
Cornell Big Red football